Ru Kuwahata is a Japanese animator and filmmaker, best known for her stop-motion film, Negative Space for which she received critical acclaim and was co-nominated for an Academy Award nomination for Academy Award for Best Animated Short Film with co-director and husband Max Porter.

Filmography
 2017: Negative Space (Short) 
 2016: Perfect Houseguest (Short)  
 2014: Between Times (Short)  
 2010: Something Left, Something Taken (Short)

Awards and nominations
 Nominated: Academy Award for Best Animated Short Film

References

External links
 

Living people
Japanese producers
Japanese directors
Japanese animators
Stop motion animators
Japanese women animators
Japanese animated film directors
Japanese animated film producers
Japanese women film directors
Japanese women film producers
Year of birth missing (living people)
21st-century Japanese women